Estradiol benzoate/estradiol phenylpropionate/testosterone propionate/testosterone phenylpropionate/testosterone isocaproate (EB/EPP/TP/TPP/TiC), sold under the brand names Estandron Prolongatum, Lynandron Prolongatum, and Mixogen, was an injectable combination medication of the estrogens estradiol benzoate (EB) and estradiol phenylpropionate (EPP) and the androgens/anabolic steroids testosterone propionate (TP), testosterone phenylpropionate (TPP), and testosterone isocaproate (TiC) which was used in menopausal hormone therapy for women. It was also used to suppress lactation in postpartum women.

The medication was provided in the form of 1 mL ampoules and 2 mL vials containing 1 mg/mL EB, 4 mg/mL EPP, 20 mg/mL TP, 40 mg/mL TPP, and 40 mg/mL TiC in an oil solution and was administered by intramuscular injection. EB/EPP/TP/TPP/TiC reportedly has a duration of about 14 days.

Estandron Prolongatum, Lynandron Prolongatum, and Mixogen were all introduced for medical use by 1956. Oral tablet products with the same brand names of Estandron, Lynandron, and Mixogen, containing ethinylestradiol and methyltestosterone, were marketed around the same time, and should not be confused with the injectable products. Estandron Prolongatum, Lynandron Prolongatum, and Mixogen remained marketed as late as the 1980s. EB/EPP/TP/TPP/TiC appears to no longer be marketed.

See also
 Estradiol benzoate/estradiol phenylpropionate
 List of combined sex-hormonal preparations

References

Abandoned drugs
Combined estrogen–androgen formulations